Latyr Fall (born 19 June 1994) is a Senegalese professional footballer who plays for Portuguese club Estrela da Amadora as midfielder.

References

External links
 

1994 births
Sportspeople from Saint-Louis, Senegal
Living people
Senegalese footballers
Association football midfielders
Liga Portugal 2 players
Campeonato de Portugal (league) players
G.D. Chaves players
Juventude de Pedras Salgadas players
SC Mirandela players
Académico de Viseu F.C. players
C.D. Feirense players
C.F. Estrela da Amadora players
Senegalese expatriate footballers
Expatriate footballers in Portugal
Senegalese expatriate sportspeople in Portugal